Frank Pack (April 10, 1928 – January 26, 2000) was an American Major League Baseball player who pinch hit in one game for the St. Louis Browns on June 5, .

External links

1928 births
2000 deaths
St. Louis Browns players
Baseball players from Tennessee
Anderson Rebels players
Augusta Tigers players
Elmira Pioneers players
Globe-Miami Browns players
Granby Phillies players
Mayfield Clothiers players
Port Chester Clippers players
San Antonio Missions players
Spartanburg Peaches players
Toledo Mud Hens players
American expatriate baseball players in Canada